Tacna Cathedral is a church located in the center of the city of Tacna, Peru.

History
Its construction began in 1875 by the French firm of Alejandro Gustave Eiffel. Because of the War of the Pacific (1879) and the Chilean occupation, the work stopped. The church was formally completed in 1954.

Architecture
It is built in the neo-renaissance architectural style. It is created with stones quarried from the hills of Intiorko and Arunta.

References
Notes

 i perú (2014), "Información de Tacna".

Churches in Peru
Buildings and structures in Tacna Region